Wuzi Yanzong Wan  is a deep brown pill used in traditional Chinese medicine to "replenish the kidney with vital essence". It tastes sweet, sour and slightly bitter. It is used where there is "deficiency syndrome of the kidney marked by backache, dribbling of urine after micturition, seminal emission, premature ejaculation, impotence and sterility".   The binding agent of the pill is honey.

Chinese classic herbal formula

See also
 Chinese classic herbal formula
 Bu Zhong Yi Qi Wan

References

Traditional Chinese medicine pills